Keith Carpenter (born c. 1930) was a Canadian football player who played for the Edmonton Eskimos and Winnipeg Blue Bombers. He played college football at San Jose State University.

References

1930s births
Living people
American football tackles
American players of Canadian football
Canadian football tackles
San Jose State Spartans football players
Edmonton Elks players
Winnipeg Blue Bombers players